The 1927 Washington Senators won 85 games, lost 69, and finished in third place in the American League. They were managed by Bucky Harris and played home games at Griffith Stadium.

Offseason
 January 15, 1927: Roger Peckinpaugh was traded by the Senators to the Chicago White Sox for Sloppy Thurston and Leo Mangum.
 January 31, 1927: Tris Speaker was signed as a free agent by the Senators.

Regular season
 September 30, 1927: Senators' pitcher Tom Zachary gave up Babe Ruth's 60th home run of the season, breaking Ruth's own record for homers in one season of 59 set in 1921.

Season standings

Record vs. opponents

Roster

Player stats

Batting

Starters by position 
Note: Pos = Position; G = Games played; AB = At bats; H = Hits; Avg. = Batting average; HR = Home runs; RBI = Runs batted in

Other batters 
Note: G = Games played; AB = At bats; H = Hits; Avg. = Batting average; HR = Home runs; RBI = Runs batted in

Pitching

Starting pitchers 
Note: G = Games pitched; IP = Innings pitched; W = Wins; L = Losses; ERA = Earned run average; SO = Strikeouts

Other pitchers 
Note: G = Games pitched; IP = Innings pitched; W = Wins; L = Losses; ERA = Earned run average; SO = Strikeouts

Relief pitchers 
Note: G = Games pitched; W = Wins; L = Losses; SV = Saves; ERA = Earned run average; SO = Strikeouts

Notes

References
1927 Washington Senators at Baseball-Reference
1927 Washington Senators team page at www.baseball-almanac.com

Minnesota Twins seasons
Washington Senators season
Washing